, also Okubo, Ohkubo and Ookubo, is a Japanese surname.  Notable people with the surname include:

Ōkubo clan
Ōkubo Tadayo (1532–1594), Japanese daimyō of the Sengoku period
Ōkubo Tadasuke (1537–1613), Japanese daimyō of the Sengoku and Edo periods
Ōkubo Nagayasu (1545–1613), Japanese samurai of the Edo period
Ōkubo Tadachika (1553–1628), Japanese daimyō of the Sengoku and Edo periods
Ōkubo Tadataka (1560–1639), Japanese samurai of the Sengoku and Edo periods
Ōkubo Tadazane (1778–1837), Japanese daimyō of the late Edo period
Ōkubo Toshimichi (1830–1878), Japanese samurai and later leader of the Meiji restoration

Contemporary
Atsushi Ōkubo, Japanese manga author
Benji Okubo, American artist
Hiroshi Okubo, Japanese video game music composer
James K. Okubo, American Medal of Honor recipient
Ōkubo Haruno, Japanese general
Hideo Ohkubo, Japanese businessman
, Japanese cyclist
, Japanese Nordic combined skier
Kayoko Okubo, Japanese comedian
Kiyoshi Ōkubo, Japanese serial killer
Mariko Okubo, Japanese actress
Miné Okubo, American artist
Tsutomu Okubo, Japanese politician
Susumu Ōkubo, who proposed the Gell-Mann–Okubo mass formula
, Japanese sport wrestler
Yukishige Okubo, Japanese politician
, Japanese snowboarder

Footballers
Goshi Okubo, Japanese footballer
Makoto Okubo, Japanese footballer
Takuo Ōkubo, Japanese footballer
Tetsuya Ōkubo, Japanese footballer
Yoshito Ōkubo, Japanese footballer
Yuki Okubo, Japanese footballer

See also
Ōkubo, Akita, which merged with Iidagawa to become Shōwa, Akita in 1942
Okubo Institute of Technology
Ōkubo Station (disambiguation), multiple train stations

Japanese-language surnames